Antonio Ayala Jr. (February 13, 1963 – May 12, 2015) was an American professional boxer who competed in the light middleweight division. He began his professional career in 1980, and by 1982 he had compiled a record of 22 wins and no losses, with 19 knockouts. Ayala was born to a boxing family, and had three brothers who were boxers, Mike Ayala, Paulie Ayala and Sammy Ayala. Tony Ayala is considered one of the most promising boxing wasted talents by boxing writers and historians, as his career cut short after he was imprisoned in 1983, at the age of 19. His first shot at the world title never happened due to his personal troubles and later conviction, while his second shot proved unsuccessful, as he was 40 years old and out-of-shape by that time.

Biography

Early life
Ayala was born in San Antonio, Texas. Tony is the brother of former boxers Mike Ayala and Sammy Ayala and the son of trainer Tony Ayala, Sr.

Amateur career
Many have said Ayala was a boxing prodigy, he first fought at the age of five, at the age of six he avenged his first defeat. At the age of eight, he was rumored to suffer his last loss. At fourteen, he was battering a world champion around the ring. At 15, he knocked out Sugar Ray Leonard's older brother, Roger Leonard. At that point, his achievements was a bit overshadowed by his older brother Mike, who turned pro in 1975, and by the early 1980 was the number one ranked super bantamweight fighter in the world, so Tony was dubbed simply the "other fighting Ayala."

Highlights
 National Golden Gloves (165 lbs), Indianapolis, Indiana, March 1979:
1/2: Defeated Vaughn Hooks PTS
Finals: Defeated Lamont Kirkland PTS
 National Sports Festival (165 lbs), Colorado Springs, Colorado, July 1979:
Finals: Defeated Alex Ramon PTS

Ayala won National Junior Olympic titles in 1977 and 1978 as well as a National Golden Gloves championship in 1979, compiling an amateur record of 140–8 with sixty knockouts. He was one of Olympic hopefuls for the 1980 Summer Olympics, but turned pro instead of qualifying at the National Olympic Trials in Atlanta, Georgia (as Ayala withdrew, Charles Carter qualified for the U.S. Olympic Team in the middleweight class, but the U.S. participation was canceled soon thereafter due to the boycott).

Professional career
Ayala turned professional in June 1980 with a one-round knockout of Zip Castillo and proceeded to score three other first round knock outs in a row. He was co-managed by the Duva family, namely by Lou Duva, Dan Duva, and Kathy Duva. By December 1981 Ayala, the 18-year-old, was rated No. 3 by the World Boxing Association.

The young boxer was known as a savage brawler who was often considered a "dirty" fighter; for example, on one occasion, he spit on his opponent after knocking him to the ground. He also admitted to using heroin before a fight on three occasions (his brother Mike Ayala also made allegations of using drugs before his world title fight against Danny Lopez). In the summer of 1981, teenager Ayala was featured in a cover story of Sports Illustrated as a rising star in boxing. Veteran boxing writer Michael Katz claimed he was the best young fighter he had ever seen; Muhammad Ali's trainer Angelo Dundee said he thought Ayala could have been one of boxing's greatest fighters. On September 16, 1981, Ayala fought on the undercard of the legendary fight between Sugar Ray Leonard and Thomas Hearns.

Personal troubles
By summer 1982 Ayala split with and got back with his 18-year-old wife Lisa, they were living in New Jersey, not far from the Duvas. Twice a week, on Mondays and Fridays, he attended meetings of the local Alcoholics Anonymous. On Wednesdays, he drove to New York to attend meetings at the Freedom Institute. On November 19, 1982, Ayala was scheduled to meet Roberto Durán, the former lightweight and welterweight champion, in a 12-round junior middleweight bout co-promoted by Dan Duva and Don King, scheduled to be shown in prime time by NBC. During August-September 1982 he took a monthly course in a clinic, Care Unit Hospital in Orange, California, as part of a plea deal for one of his earlier attacks. Though he was allowed to leave for training purposes. The rehabilitation program kept him from having a $750,000 payday against Roberto Duran. When the Duran fight didn't happen, Ayala settled for about $150,000 to fight Argentinian Carlos Herrera. 'It doesn't bother me,' he said. 'I'm looking at it as a step closer to the world title. Davey Moore is going to have to meet me after this fight.'

Rape conviction
After defeating Carlos Herrera, November 20, 1982, he was scheduled to fight champion Davey Moore. By December 1982, Ayala was already a second-ranked junior middleweight in the world.

The fight was not to be. On January 1, 1983, Ayala burglarized the home of his neighbor, a young schoolteacher, and brutally sexually assaulted her. Although he was only 19 years old, Ayala had already been convicted twice of assaults against women. One of these attacks took place in the restroom of a drive-in theatre and left the victim with a broken back. He had been given probation for these offenses. Under a repeat offender's law, he was sentenced to 35 years in prison. The prosecutor at trial argued the young boxer should serve the full term because he was a danger to the community.

Ayala Jr served his sentence term at Rahway State Prison and Trenton State Prison and released in 1999.

Release in 1999
Ayala was paroled from prison in 1999 and resumed his boxing career, winning six high-profile fights, all by knockout. Ayala was still popular in his hometown, however women's rights organizations often protested at his fights. An eliminator against hard hitting ex-champ Yori Boy Campas brought an end to his unlikely comeback, a hand injury caused Ayala to quit on his stool after 8 rounds. His troubles with the law continued. In 2000, he was shot in the shoulder by a young woman after breaking into her home. At Ayala's trial the prosecution pointed out this was almost an exact replay of Ayala's 1983 offense. He received probation and a brief jail term for this offense. In 2003, Ayala was charged with having sex with a thirteen-year-old girl, but the charges were dismissed when the girl said she lied about it.

Reincarceration in 2004
In 2004, Ayala was sentenced to ten years in prison for violation of probation after he was pulled over in his vehicle for speeding, and was also charged with driving without a license, heroin possession and possession of pornography in his vehicle. Tony Jr. was housed at the private Sanders Estes Unit for lower-level offenders in Venus, Southeast of Fort Worth, where he worked as a janitor. He was also housed at the Robertson unit in Abilene Texas a maximum security prison.

Release in 2014 and father's funeral
Ayala was released on April 25, 2014. He did not grant any interviews or make any appearances or public statements during his second incarceration.

His father, Tony Ayala Sr., who still owned and operated the Zarzamora Street Gym in San Antonio, died on April 10, 2014. Tony was granted special permission to attend his father's funeral on April 16, 2014, greeting family, friends, and fans, his first public appearance in over a decade. He then returned to custody to serve the remaining nine days of his sentence.

El Torito at Zarzamora Street Gym
Tony Ayala Jr. assisted his brothers, Mike Ayala and Sammy Ayala, in the running of the Zarzamora Street Gym in San Antonio, following his father's death.

Death
Ayala died on May 12, 2015, age 52, from an apparent overdose at Zarzamora Street Gym, San Antonio, Texas. It has been reported in the media that drug paraphernalia was found near his body.

Professional boxing record

References

External links 

 Best Prospect of All-Time
  (history)

1963 births
2015 deaths
Boxers from Texas
American boxers of Mexican descent
Middleweight boxers
American male boxers
Prisoners and detainees of Texas
American people convicted of burglary
American people convicted of rape
American sportspeople convicted of crimes
Drug-related deaths in the United States